Jerboas (from  ) are hopping desert rodents found throughout North Africa and Asia, and are members of the family Dipodidae. They tend to live in hot deserts. 

Some species are preyed on by little owls (Athene noctua) in central Asia. Most species of jerboas have excellent hearing that they use to avoid becoming the prey of nocturnal predators. The typical lifespan of a jerboa is around 6 years.

Taxonomy
Jerboas, as previously defined, were thought to be paraphyletic, with the jumping mice (Zapodidae) and birch mice (Sminthidae) also classified in the family Dipodidae. However, phylogenetic analysis split all three as distinct families, leaving just the jerboas in Dipodidae and revealing them to be a monophyletic group.

Anatomy and body features
Jerboas look somewhat like miniature kangaroos, and have some external similarities. Both have long hind legs, short forelegs, and long tails. Jerboas move around in a similar manner to kangaroos, which is by hopping, or saltation. However, their anatomy is more attuned towards erratic hopping locomotion, making use of sharp turns and great vertical leaps to confuse and escape predators, rather than for sustained hopping over long periods of time. It has been found that when executing their vertical leaps primary tendons in the hindlimbs only recovered and reused on average 4.4% of energy contributed to the jump, lower than many hopping animals.

Like other bipedal animals, their foramen magnum — the hole at the base of the skull — is forward-shifted, which enhances two-legged locomotion. The tail of a jerboa can be longer than its head and body, and a white cluster of hair is commonly seen at the end of the tail. Jerboas use their tails to balance when hopping, and as a prop when sitting upright. Jerboa fur is fine, and usually the colour of sand. This colour usually matches the jerboa habitat (an example of cryptic colouration). Some species of the jerboa family have long ears like a rabbit, whilst others have ears that are short like those of a mouse or rat.

Behavior
The bipedal locomotion of jerboas involves hopping, skipping, and running gaits, associated with rapid and frequent, difficult-to-predict changes in speed and direction, facilitating predator evasion relative to quadrupedal locomotion. This may explain why evolution of bipedal locomotion is favored in desert-dwelling rodents that forage in open habitats.

Jerboas are most active at twilight (crepuscular). During the heat of the day, they shelter in burrows. At night, they leave the burrows due to the cooler temperature of their environment. They dig the entrances to their burrow near plant life, especially along field borders. During the rainy season, they make tunnels in mounds or hills to reduce the risk of flooding. In the summer, jerboas occupying holes plug the entrance to keep out hot air and, some researchers speculate, predators. In most cases, burrows are constructed with an emergency exit that ends just below the surface or opens at the surface but is not strongly obstructed. This allows the jerboa to quickly escape predators. 

Related jerboas often create four types of burrows. A temporary, summer day burrow is used for cover while hunting during the daylight. They have a second, temporary burrow used for hunting at night. They also have two permanent burrows: one for summer and one for winter. The permanent summer burrow is actively used throughout the summer and the young are raised there. Jerboas hibernate during the winter and use the permanent winter burrow for this. Temporary burrows are shorter in length than permanent burrows.  Just like other animals that hibernate, these creatures are heavier pre-hibernation specifically in ungrazed sites (Shuai).   Also, more food availability during pre-hibernation contributes to larger jerboa body mass in ungrazed regions, and entices more jerboas to migrate to ungrazed areas during post-hibernation. Grazing negatively impacts the Jerboa pre- and post-hibernation population, but not the survival rate. 

Jerboas are solitary creatures. Once they reach adulthood, they usually have their own burrow and search for food on their own. However, occasional "loose colonies" may form, whereby some species of jerboa dig communal burrows that offer extra warmth when it is cold outside.

Diet
Most jerboas rely on plant material as the main component of their diet, but they cannot eat hard seeds. Some species opportunistically eat beetles and other insects they come across. Unlike gerbils, jerboas are not known to store their food.

Communication and perception
Many species within the family Dipodidae engage in dust bathing, often a way to use chemical communication. Their keen hearing suggests they may use sounds or vibrations to communicate.

Reproduction
Mating systems of closely related species in the family Dipodidae suggest that they may be polygynous. For some closely related jerboa species, mating usually happens a short time after awaking from winter hibernation. A female breeds twice in the summer, and raises from two to six young. Gestation time is between 25 and 35 days. Little is known about parental investment in long-eared jerboas. Like most mammals, females nurse and care for their young at least until they are weaned.

Classification

 Family Dipodidae
 Subfamily Cardiocraniinae
 Cardiocranius
 Five-toed pygmy jerboa, Cardiocranius paradoxus
 Salpingotus
 Thick-tailed pygmy jerboa, Salpingotus crassicauda
 Heptner's pygmy jerboa, Salpingotus heptneri
 Kozlov's pygmy jerboa, Salpingotus kozlovi
 Baluchistan pygmy jerboa, Salpingotus michaelis
 Pallid pygmy jerboa, Salpingotus pallidus
 Thomas's pygmy jerboa, Salpingotus thomasi
 Subfamily Dipodinae
 Dipus
 Northern three-toed jerboa, Dipus sagitta
 Eremodipus
 Lichtenstein's jerboa, Eremodipus lichensteini
 Jaculus
 Blanford's jerboa, Jaculus blanfordi
 Lesser Egyptian jerboa, Jaculus jaculus
 Greater Egyptian jerboa, Jaculus orientalis
 Stylodipus
 Andrews's three-toed jerboa, Stylodipus andrewsi
 Mongolian three-toed jerboa, Stylodipus sungorus
 Thick-tailed three-toed jerboa, Stylodipus telum
 Subfamily Euchoreutinae
 Euchoreutes
 Long-eared jerboa, Euchoreutes naso
 Subfamily Allactaginae
 Allactaga
 Balikun jerboa, Allactaga balikunica
 Gobi jerboa, Allactaga bullata
 Iranian jerboa, Allactaga firouzi
 Hotson's jerboa, Allactaga hotsoni
 Great jerboa, Allactaga major
 Severtzov's jerboa, Allactaga severtzovi
 Mongolian five-toed jerboa, Allactaga sibirica
 Bobrinski's jerboa, Allactodipus bobrinskii
 Pygeretmus
 Lesser fat-tailed jerboa, Pygeretmus platyurus
 Dwarf fat-tailed jerboa, Pygeretmus pumilio
 Greater fat-tailed jerboa, Pygeretmus shitkovi
 Scarturus
 Small five-toed jerboa, Scarturus elater
 Euphrates jerboa, Scarturus euphratica
 Four-toed jerboa, Scarturus tetradactyla
 Vinogradov's jerboa, Scarturus vinogradovi
 Williams's jerboa, Scarturus williamsi
 Subfamily Paradipodinae
 Paradipus
 Comb-toed jerboa, Paradipus ctenodactylus

See also
 Hopping mouse – a similar murid rodent native to Australia; an example of parallel evolution
 Jumping mouse – a nondesert-dwelling relative of jerboas in the family Zapodidae, native to China and North America
 Kangaroo rat and kangaroo mouse – similar heteromyid rodents native to North America; an example of convergence
 Kultarr – a distantly related marsupial with a similar body plan and coloration; another example of convergence: They use quadrupedal locomotion, but their large aerial phases cause them to be confused with hopping mice.
 Springhare – a similar pedetid rodent native to southern and eastern Africa

References

External links
 Long Eared Jerboa caught on film BBC - retrieved 10 December 2007

 
Dipodoid rodents
Extant Miocene first appearances
 
Rodents of North Africa